The Taipingling Nuclear Power Plant is a nuclear power station under construction in Huangbu Town, Huidong County, Huizhou city on the coast of Guangdong Province, in southeast China. 
The plant is owned by CGN Huizhou Nuclear Power Co.
CGN originally planned to have AP1000 light water reactors, but later changed plans to the Hualong One design.

Approval for the plant was granted in February 2019 and first concrete for Unit 1 was poured in December 2019.

Reactor data

See also

Nuclear power in China

References

External links
 

Nuclear power stations in China
Buildings and structures under construction in China
Nuclear power stations with proposed reactors